Reggie McKenzie may refer to:

Reggie McKenzie (guard) (born 1950), offensive guard who played in the NFL, 1972–1984
Reggie McKenzie (linebacker) (born 1963), linebacker and general manager in the NFL